Paul Jacobs is the name of:

Paul Jacobs (activist) (1918–1978), American activist
Paul Jacobs and the Nuclear Gang, documentary film about the above
Paul Jacobs (Flemish writer) (born 1949), Flemish author
Paul Jacobs (ice hockey) (1894–1973), professional hockey player
Paul Jacobs (composer), American songwriter
Paul Jacobs (organist) (born 1977), American organist
Paul Jacobs (pianist) (1930–1983), American pianist
Paul Jacobs (politician), American politician
Paul E. Jacobs (born 1962), former executive chairman of Qualcomm
Paul Emil Jacobs (1802–1866), German painter

See also
Paul Jacob (born 1960), activist